Altilia is a town and comune in the province of Cosenza in the Calabria region of southern Italy. The comune includes the frazione of Maione.

See also
 Savuto river

References

External links
Town photo
Altilia Photos from Panoramio.com

Cities and towns in Calabria